A warship is a ship built and primarily intended for war.

Warship may also refer to:

Warship (band), an American post-hardcore band
Warship (journal), a yearly periodical produced by Conway Publishing
Warship (1973 TV series), a 1973–1977 British drama television series that was broadcast on BBC1
Warship (2010 TV series), a 2010 British documentary television series that aired on Channel 5

British locomotives
 British Rail Class 42 B'B' diesel railway locomotives, because they were named after warships
 British Rail Class 43 (Warship Class) B'B' diesel railway locomotives, of similar design but different builder to the British Rail Class 42
 British Rail Class D20/2 'D600' class (also known anachronistically as British Rail Class 41) A1A'A1A locomotives, also named after warships and carrying the sign 'Warship Class' on the nameplate